JML (John Mills Limited) is a consumer product company based around the UK specialising in the promotion of products with video screens in retail stores.

The company develops products in the categories of homewares, health & beauty, DIY and gifts and sells them through its website, TV channels and retail. 

In addition to its own products, JML distributes products from other international direct response television (DRTV) suppliers.

History 
John Mills founded JML in the basement of his house in Camden in 1986. Reverting to a model of selling at trade shows, the company expanded into consumer selling after a trial involving end-of-aisle video demonstrations in third-party owned retail shops.

JML first established its headquarters in Kentish Town, North London. This was home to one third of the company's workforce, containing the product development, marketing, direct to consumer, video production, international sales and broadcast operations. 
In 2016 JML moved its headquarters to Chiswick, West London, as part of its expansion plans. 

JML's fulfilment centre is based in Port of Tyne, comprising a 24/7 call centre, retail sales team, warehouse and distribution facility.

In 2010 it was named as one of Europe's Top 500 Growth Companies.

In June 2019 JML's current CEO, Ken Daly, was elected as Chairman of the Europe Board of Directors for the ERA (Electronic Retailing Association)

Divisions

JML Retail 
JML's core business is retail screen promotions. These can be found in various UK and Irish retailers including Asda, Boots, Robert Dyas, Argos, Tesco and Wilko.

JML Direct 
The brand also has a direct-to-consumer business through its JML Direct TV shopping channel (operating on Sky 661 and Freesat 806), website and bi-yearly catalogue. The UK infomercials are largely produced in-house as well as featuring product demonstration video content from across the globe. JML also broadcasts through third parties.

References

External links 
 

Companies based in the London Borough of Hounslow
Retail companies established in 1986
Mail-order retailers